Sarconema is a genus of nematodes belonging to the family Onchocercidae.

The species of this genus are found in Northern America.

Species:

Sarconema eurycerca 
Sarconema pseudolabiata

References

Nematodes